Adaklı, historically Keret, is a village in the Nizip District, Gaziantep Province, Turkey. The village is inhabited by Turkmens and had a population of 585 in 2022.

References

Villages in Nizip District